The Republic Motor Truck Company was a manufacturer of commercial trucks circa 1913 - 1929, in Alma, Michigan. By 1918, it was recognized as the largest exclusive truck manufacturer in the world, and the maker of one out of every nine trucks on the roads in the United States. It was one of the major suppliers of "Liberty trucks" used by American troops during World War I.

History
The precursor to Republic Motor Truck Company was the Alma Manufacturing Company, founded by Frank Ruggles, which began producing trucks in 1913 for the Maxwell Motor Company under the Hercules name. Not long afterwards, Ruggles reorganized the company, first as the Alma Motor Truck Company and then (after changing the truck's name from Hercules to Republic) as the Republic Motor Truck Company .

The company got some early publicity from two firsthand accounts of cross-country trips using Republic trucks. One trip was taken by two men, Lester Poyer and H. L. Dewey, and their adventures were later published as a book, 4080 Mile Haul By Republic Dispatch Truck. This trip was later confused with one taken by the author Edgar Rice Burroughs (creator of Tarzan) and his family, whose adventures were chronicled in the pamphlet "An Auto-Biography" that was distributed by the company.

The company was already doing well by 1916, but the entry of the United States into World War I gave the company a further boost when it won one of the government's contracts to build several thousand of the so-called Liberty trucks. In 1917, Republic purchased a major supplier, Torbensen Axle Company.

By 1918, Republic was advertising in such national publications as the Saturday Evening Post, declaring that one goes to "Damascus for swords, Teheran [sic] for rugs, Lynn for shoes, Rochester for cameras, Dayton for cash registers, Alma for trucks." Over 3,000 dealers served the United States, with additional dealers in at least 56 foreign countries and colonies.

At the end of the war, Republic, which now had an annual capacity of 30,000 trucks a year, decided to expand and financed this expansion by issuing $3 million in gold notes. However, a postwar depression combined with the return of thousands of Liberty trucks to the United States led to a major reduction in demand for new trucks. Republic's output dropped to 1,453 in 1921. Selling Torbensen Axle in 1922 (later Eaton Axle and Spring, now Eaton Corporation) was insufficient to meet cash demands, and Republic was forced into receivership. After reorganization, the company attempted unsuccessfully to regain its former status as a preferred manufacturer, buying the Linn Manufacturing Company, makers of the heavy-duty Linn tractor, in 1927.

After the sudden death of its president, Oliver Hayes, in 1928, the company merged with the American LaFrance Company to become LaFrance-Republic. LaFrance-Republic in turn was purchased by the Sterling Motor Truck Company in 1932, which was purchased by the White Motor Company in 1951. A parts depot for Republic existed in Alma until 1957.

See also
 G-numbers (list of World War I trucks)
 Sterling Trucks

References and notes

Further reading
 Gabrick, Robert. Lost Truck Legends: An Illustrated History of Unique, Small-Scale Truck Builders. Hudson, Wisconsin: Enthusiast Books, 2012.
McMacken, David. Flash and fizzle : the rise and fall the Republic Motor Truck Company of Alma, Michigan. Michigan: Alma Public Library, 2011.

External links
 http://www.johncolemanburroughs.com/mag0/0030.html
 http://www.eaton.com/us/en-us/company/about-us/our-heritage.html
 https://web.archive.org/web/20081227112626/http://www.transchool.eustis.army.mil/Museum/LIBTrucks.htm

Defunct truck manufacturers of the United States
Defunct manufacturing companies based in Michigan